Siddharth Slathia (born 25 July 1991) is an Indian indi-pop and playback singer. Siddharth Slathia is also the Founder & Owner Of the record label Synk Records. He is also a music composer and a songwriter.He represented India and performed at the closing ceremony of “Asian Games” 2018 in Jakarta, Indonesia. He got popular on YouTube when his cover versions of Hindi film songs received positive response.He has more than 2 million followers on YouTube. He became more well known after singing 20 Retro songs on 1 chord and Retro Medlies. He is one of the most subscribed independent male Youtube singers of India. He received the "Social Media Hero" award in 2016 in Chennai, India.
He is very popular on Facebook and Instagram with more than 1.5 million followers. He has also become an influencer and endorses many brands on his social media.

Early life and career
Slathia was born in Jammu of the Jammu and Kashmir state. He is the son on Mr Kulrattan Slathia and Madhu Lata. As of July 2020 he is 29 years old. His parents have sent him from Jammu to Jaipur to study engineering. However, after watching 3 Idiots film he dropped out of the engineering course to pursue a career in singing. Slathia songs first appeared on the social media in the year 2009. His uploaded song "Akhiyan nu rehn de" received good response, which motivated him to upload more videos. He also uploaded few videos on "How to Sing" which made him very popular among young singers of the country. He then became the Chief Mentor at "Indian Idol Academy". He completed his graduation in music from Jammu University. He learned under many Gurus, Pt. Kundan Mal ji, Pt. Bhola Nath Mishra and few in his music college. He moved to Mumbai in June 2016. He has worked with leading composers like A R Rahman, Salim – Sulaiman. He also performed at the Dabangg Tour in Hong Kong with Salman Khan and team. He recently performed at the closing ceremony of Asian Games at Jakarta, Indonesia. His cover songs and old songs medleys are most viewed videos on YouTube.

Music influences
According to Slathia, although he respects a wide variety of musical artists, he considers Mohammad Rafi as his inspiration.

References

People from Jammu
Indian male pop singers
Living people
1991 births